TV6 may refer to:
TV-6 (Russia), defunct first Russian commercial television channel launched in 1993 and closed in 2002
TV6 (France), defunct French television channel broadcasting in 1986 and 1987, predecessor to M6
TV6 (1994), Nordic television channel, renamed Viasat Nature/Crime in 1998

TV6 (Sweden), Swedish television channel launched in 2006
TV6 (Latvia), Latvian television channel launched in 2007
TV6 (Estonia), Estonian television channel launched in 2008
TV6 (Lithuania), Lithuanian television channel launched in 2008
CCN TV6, television channel on Trinidad and Tobago

Channel 6 (Ireland), Irish television channel, closed in 2009
TV6 (Poland), Planned polish station in 2011 year
WLUC-TV, Marquette, Michigan, United States

See also
Channel 6 (disambiguation)